Miroslav Šuta (born 1969 in Chomutov, Czechoslovakia) is a  Czech environmental expert and non-fiction writer.

He has been a member of the National committee for chemical safety since 1997 and several working groups of European Environmental Bureau (EEB).

He published articles in several Czech magazines, for example  Respekt, Literární noviny, Sedmá generace (Seventh Generation), Odpady (Waste) or EKO - ekologie a společnost (ECO - ecology and society). He also works with Czech TV and Czech radio.

Bibliography 
 1996 – The effects of car exhaust gases on human health (Czech and Slovak Traffic Club)
 2007 – Biotechnology, environment and sustainable development (Společnost pro trvale udržitelný život)
 2008 – Chemicals in environment and health (Ekologický institut Veronica, Brno)

References

External links 
 Blog, Miroslav Šuta 
 Miroslav Šuta: Kdo potřebuje rajčata s prodlouženou trvanlivostí? 
 Society for Sustainable Living 

Czech non-fiction writers
Czech bloggers
Male bloggers
1969 births
People from Chomutov
Living people
Czechoslovak environmentalists